Wessex '82 is a split EP release by UK punk bands The Subhumans, The Pagans, Organised Chaos and The A-Heads. Each band contributed one track to the record. This was also the first vinyl release on the Subhumans' own label, Bluurg Records.

Track listing
 Subhumans – "No Thanks"
 The Pagans – "Wave Goodbye to Your Dreams"
 Organized Chaos – "Victim"
 A-Heads – "No Rule"

Personnel
Adrian Pickford – cover artwork
Steve Collinson – engineering (track 4)

References

1982 EPs